Insurgent, insurgents or insurgency can refer to:

 The act of insurgency

Specific insurgencies

 Iraqi insurgency, uprising in Iraq
 Insurgency in Jammu and Kashmir, uprising in India
 Insurgency in North-East India
 Iraq War insurgent attacks
 Silesian Insurgents Monument
 Slovak Insurgent Air Force
 South Thailand insurgency
 Taliban insurgency
 Ukrainian Insurgent Army

Memorials

 Insurgents Cemetery, cemetery in Serbia
 Monument to the Insurgents, monument in Serbia
 Warsaw Insurgents Cemetery, cemetery in Poland

Other
 Insurge Pictures, a low-cost horror film label for Paramount Pictures
 The Insurgents, film
 , US Navy ship
 Clandestine Insurgent Rebel Clown Army
 Insurgence Records
 Insurgency: Modern Infantry Combat, multiplayer, tactical first person shooter video game using Source engine
 Insurgent (novel), the second book in the Divergent trilogy written by Veronica Roth
 The Divergent Series: Insurgent, the film adaptation of the Roth novel
 Insurgency (video game), a 2014 multiplayer tactical first-person shooter video game
 Insurgency: Sandstorm, 2018 sequel to Insurgency

See also
 
 
 
 
 Insurgentes (disambiguation)